Cosmic Knights is an anthology of themed fantasy and science fiction short stories on the subject of knights edited by Isaac Asimov, Martin H. Greenberg and Charles G. Waugh. The third volume in their Isaac Asimov's Magical Worlds of Fantasy series, it was first published in paperback by Signet/New American Library in January 1985. The first British edition was issued in trade paperback by Robinson in July 1987.

The book collects ten novellas, novelettes and short stories by various fantasy and science fiction authors, with an introduction by Asimov.

Contents
"Introduction: In Days of Old" (Isaac Asimov)
"Crusader Damosel" (Vera Chapman)
"Divers Hands" (Darrell Schweitzer)
"The Reluctant Dragon" (Kenneth Grahame)
"The Immortal Game" (Poul Anderson)
"The Stainless-Steel Knight" (John T. Phillifent)
"Diplomat-at-Arms" (Keith Laumer)
"Dream Damsel" (Evan Hunter)
"The Last Defender of Camelot" (Roger Zelazny)
"A Knyght Ther Was" (Robert F. Young)
"Divide and Rule" (L. Sprague de Camp)

Notes

1985 anthologies
Fantasy anthologies
Science fiction anthologies
Martin H. Greenberg anthologies
Signet Books books